Xylopia championii is a species of plant in the Annonaceae family. It is endemic to the rainforest understory in Sri Lanka. It is known as අතු කැටිය (athu ketiya) or දත් කැටිය (dath ketiya) in Sinhala.

References
 http://informahealthcare.com/doi/abs/10.1080/13880200801887989?journalCode=phb
 http://www.theplantlist.org/tpl/record/kew-2468060
 http://hub.hku.hk/handle/10722/57160
 http://plants.jstor.org/specimen/k000574723

championii
Endemic flora of Sri Lanka
Vulnerable flora of Asia